"Run Like Hell" is a song by the English progressive rock band Pink Floyd, written by David Gilmour and Roger Waters. It appears on the album The Wall. It was released as a single in 1980, reaching #15 in the Canadian singles chart and #18 in Sweden, but it only reached #53 in the U.S.  A 12" single of "Run Like Hell," "Don't Leave Me Now" and "Another Brick in the Wall (Part 2)" peaked at #57 on the Disco Top 100 chart in the U.S. To date, it is the last original composition written by both Gilmour and Waters, the last of such under the Pink Floyd banner, and is the last composition ever recorded by all four members of the classic 70s-era Floyd lineup together, within their traditional instrumental roles of Waters on bass, Gilmour on guitars, Nick Mason on drums, and Richard Wright on keyboards, on the same song.

Concept
The song is written from the narrative point of view of antihero Pink, an alienated and bitter rock star, during a hallucination in which he becomes a fascist dictator and turns a concert audience into an angry mob.

Film adaptation
In the film adaptation, Pink directs his jackbooted thugs to attack the "riff-raff" mentioned in the previous song, in which he ordered them to raid and destroy the homes of queers, Jews, and black people. One scene depicts an interracial couple cuddling in the back seat of a car when a group of neo-Nazis accost them, beating the boy and raping the girl.

The Wall director Alan Parker hired the Tilbury Skins, a skinhead gang from Essex, for a scene in which Pink's "hammer guard" (in black, militaristic uniforms designed by the film's animator, Gerald Scarfe) smashes up a Pakistani diner; Parker recalled how the action "always seemed to continue long after I had yelled out 'Cut!'."

History
The music was solely written by David Gilmour (one of three songs on The Wall for which Gilmour is credited as a co-writer), and the lyrics were written by Roger Waters. Waters provides the vocals (except for Gilmour's multitracked harmonies singing "Run, run, run, run,"). The first version of the song had music written by Waters (which appears on the Immersion box set of The Wall) with the lyrics as on the album but then Waters's music was scrapped in favour of Gilmour's music during the recording of the band demos (which too appears on the Immersion box set). The song features the only keyboard solo on The Wall by Richard Wright (although on live performances, "Young Lust" and "Another Brick in the Wall, Part 2" would also feature keyboard solos); after the last line of lyrics, a synthesizer solo is played over the verse sequence, in place of vocals. Following the solo, the arrangement "empties out" and becomes sparse, with the guitar only playing an ostinato with rhythmic echoes, and brief variations every other bar. Sound effects are used to create a sense of paranoia, with the sound of cruel laughter, running footsteps, car tyres skidding, and a loud scream. The original 7" single version and Pink Floyd The Wall -- Special Radio Construction promotional EP both contain a clean guitar intro, without the live crowd effects. The EP version also contains an extended, 32-beat intro and an extended 64-beat outro where David Gilmour's main guitar phrase repeats before the track ends.

As with "Comfortably Numb", also from The Wall, the music to "Run Like Hell" has its roots in Gilmour's first solo album. "Short and Sweet" can be seen as this song's precursor. "Yes," Gilmour told Musician magazine, "it's a guitar with the bottom string tuned down to a D, and thrashing around on the chord shapes over a D root. Which is the same in both [songs]. [Smiling] It's part of my musical repertoire, yes."

Composition
After the previous song, "In The Flesh", the crowd continues to chant, "Pink! Floyd! Pink! Floyd!" The guitar intro begins with the scratching of strings dampened with left-hand muting, before settling on an open D string dampened by palm muting. As heard earlier on the album in "Another Brick in the Wall, Part 1", the muted D is treated with a specific delay setting, providing three to four loud but gradually decaying repeats, one dotted-eighth note apart, with the result that simply playing quarter notes (at 116 beats per minute) will produce a strict rhythm of one eighth note followed by two sixteenth notes, with rhythmic echoes overlapping. Over this pedal tone of D, Gilmour plays descending triads in D major (mostly D, A, and G), down to the open chord position (a quieter, second overdubbed guitar plays open chords only). Some of the guitar tracks are also treated with a heavy flanging effect.

The verses are in E minor, with pedal tones of the guitar's open E, B, and  G strings (a full E minor triad) ringing out over a sequence of power chords, resulting in the chords E minor, Fmaj7sus2(♯11), C major seventh, and Bsus4(add♭6). Providing contrast, another guitar, equally treated with delay, plays a low-pitched riff on the roots and minor sevenths of each chord, although the E♭ (minor seventh of F) and B♭ (minor seventh of C) do not match the sustaining open E and B strings an octave above.

Aside from the added tones in each chord, the basic verse sequence of E minor, F major, E minor, C major, and B major is reprised later in "The Trial", the conceptual climax of The Wall. However, David Gilmour is not credited as a co-writer of "The Trial", which is credited to Waters and producer Bob Ezrin.

Before the final riff ends the song, a piercing shriek by Roger Waters can be heard, not unlike one heard between "The Happiest Days of Our Lives" and "Another Brick in the Wall, Part 2". At the conclusion of the song, the crowd begins chanting, "Hammer! Hammer!" as the sound of soldiers marching is heard before segueing into the next song, "Waiting for the Worms".

Film version
The movie version of the song is considerably shorter than the album version, likely done for the sake of pacing. The second guitar refrain between the first and second verses was taken out, with the verse's last line, "You better run", leading directly to Gilmour's harmonized chant ("Run, run, run, run"), which now echoed back and forth between the left and right channels. Also, Richard Wright's synth solo was superimposed over the second verse, and the long instrumental break between the end of the synth solo and Waters' scream was removed.

Reception
Billboard felt that the lyrics were not as "biting" as Pink Floyd's previous single "Another Brick in the Wall, Part 2," but stated that "it's the driving, dance-oriented, percussion-filled rhythm which makes the song come alive." In 2017, they ranked the song number two on their list of the 50 greatest Pink Floyd songs. Cash Box said that "David Gilmour’s hard bitten guitar and Roger Water's incessant bass beat set the perfect instrumental mood for the lyrical paranoia."  Record World said that "a barrage of guitar/keyboard waves pound the dance-oriented rock" in this example of "brilliance from The Wall."  Ultimate Classic Rock critic Michael Gallucci rated it as the 7th best Roger Waters song with Pink Floyd, calling it "a paranoid and drug-fueled riff on the dangers of stardom and its parallels with fascism."

Live performances

Pink Floyd

The Wall Tour
During the previous song, "In the Flesh", a giant inflatable pig was released, which Waters refers to in a speech between both songs. The speech given varied slightly on each concert and therefore can be used to identify which show a recording came from. On Is There Anybody Out There? The Wall Live 1980–81, the speech is a mix of the 15 June 1981 and 17 June 1981 speeches. It was sometimes introduced by Waters as "Run Like Fuck" and Waters and Gilmour sang alternating lines in the verses, while the vocal quartet of Stan Farber, Jim Haas, Joe Chemay, and John Joyce sang the choruses.

During the song, the "surrogate band" (also referred to, in Nick Mason's book, as the "shadow band") are onstage with the Pink Floyd members and their quartet of singers. Both Andy Bown and Roger Waters play bass on this song. Bown plays the bass exactly as it was recorded—four quarter notes per bar, playing only roots, using the lowest possible root in drop D tuning. Waters, meanwhile, plays variations at key moments, plays whole notes while singing, and, during the "emptied out" section on D following the synth solo, Waters sometimes improvised high-pitched riffs above Bown's low D.

Later tours
Following Waters' departure from Pink Floyd, the song became a regular number in the band's concerts, usually ending the show and going over nine minutes long. One live version was used as the B-side to "On the Turning Away". The song also was the closing track on the live album Delicate Sound of Thunder. Gilmour generally played an extended guitar introduction, sharing vocals with touring bassist Guy Pratt, with Pratt singing Waters' lines. In the 1994 tour, Pratt sometimes sang the name of the city where they were playing instead of the word mother in the line "...they're going to send you back to mother in a cardboard box..." – in the Pulse video (live at Earls Court, 1994), he clearly sings London. According to Phil Taylor, David Gilmour played Run Like Hell on a Fender Telecaster guitar tuned to a drop-D on the 1994 tour.

Roger Waters
In Roger Waters' The Wall concert in Berlin in 1990, he made no speech and sang all the lines alone. He didn't play the bass guitar for this live version.

For Waters' worldwide 2010–2013 Wall tour, the song was transposed one whole step down, from D to C. This is commonly done in live performances when a singer has difficulty reaching the highest notes in the song's original key. During the intro of the song, Waters clapped to the beat and in some cases shouted, exhorting the audience to clap along and "have a good time, enjoy yourselves", which might be considered ironic, given the paranoid tone of the actual lyrics. Again, he did not play bass guitar, instead gesturing with a prop submachine gun at various points throughout the song.

David Gilmour
In addition to performing the song with Pink Floyd, Gilmour has also performed it himself on his 1984 solo tour in support of his About Face album. In Waters' absence, Gilmour would trade lines with bass guitarist Mickey Feat. He also performed the song solo at the Colombian Volcano benefit concert in 1986, trading lines with house-band keyboardist John "Rabbit" Bundrick (who would later play on Waters' solo album, Amused to Death) and again during his 2015-2016 Rattle That Lock Tour, trading lines with Guy Pratt. Gilmour also performed the song in 2016 in Live At Pompeii.

Personnel
Roger Waters – vocals (verses), laughter, screaming, panting
David Gilmour – guitars, bass guitar, backwards cymbals, vocals (chorus)
Nick Mason – drums
Richard Wright – Prophet-5 synthesizer (solo), organ (main riff)
with:
James Guthrie – backwards cymbals, running, panting
Bobbye Hall – congas, bongos

Personnel per Fitch and Mahon.

Hired-gun guitarist Lee Ritenour was also brought in "to beef up the sound" by producer Bob Ezrin.

Charts

|-

|-

|-

|-

|-
|}

Cover versions
 In 2001, the Canadian all-female metal band Kittie recorded a cover which was released on their full-length album Oracle. In this version, lead vocalist and lead guitarist Morgan Lander actually do incorporate the title of the song within the lyrics.
 The Disco Biscuits have covered "Run Like Hell" live since 1997.
 In 2011, Italian metal band Mastercastle recorded a cover that was released on their album Last Desire.
 On 6 March 2019, American heavy metal band Metallica bassist Robert Trujillo and guitarist Kirk Hammett jammed on the song during a concert in Kansas City, Missouri. The moment was recorded and uploaded to the band's YouTube channel the next day.

In popular culture
The opening to "Run Like Hell" is used by the Pittsburgh Pirates as the opening song when introducing the Pierogies for the Great Pierogi Race between the 5th and 6th innings.

Further reading

References

Pink Floyd songs
1979 songs
1980 singles
Songs written by David Gilmour
Songs written by Roger Waters
Songs about drugs
Songs against racism and xenophobia
Song recordings produced by Bob Ezrin
Song recordings produced by David Gilmour
Song recordings produced by Roger Waters
Harvest Records singles
Columbia Records singles